SportsPro is a brand of Henley Media Group, and a London, UK based media company for the sports industry in digital and events.

Digital
The SportsPro Media website and newsletters are sources of industry news and cover sport business appointments, developments, bids and deals across Sponsorship & Marketing, Broadcast & OTT, Technology, Finance & Investment, Major Events & Sustainability, and Women's Sport.

SportsPro also hosts podcasts

References

Business magazines published in the United Kingdom
Monthly magazines published in the United Kingdom
Sports magazines published in the United Kingdom
Magazines established in 2008